Spaghettim (Hebrew for spaghettis, Hebrew spelling: ספגטים) is an Italian cuisine restaurant in Petah Tikva, Israel. It was formerly part of a chain of 17 restaurants. The restaurant is located at HaSivim Street 18 in Kiryat Matalon. The food served is non-kosher. It can seat 140 customers.

History
Founded in the 1990s, Spaghettim grew to 17 branches, of which 13 franchises. In 2010 it nearly collapsed under its debt.

In March 2018 the chain had 2 restaurants, located in Petach Tikva and in Ramat Hasharon. By November 2018 only the branch in Petach Tikva survived. The Spaghettim website continues to offer franchise options.

References

External links
Official website

Defunct restaurant chains in Israel
Italian diaspora in Israel
Italian restaurants
Restaurants in Israel
Petah Tikva